Bitkha is a moshav in southern Israel. Located in the north-western Negev near Ofakim, it falls under the jurisdiction of Merhavim Regional Council.

History
Moshav Bitkha was established in 1950 as a ma'abara named Hakam Ha-107 (lit. The 107th Kilometer) after the milestone on the Beersheba-Gaza road which showed it to be 107 kilometers to Jerusalem. It was later converted to a moshav by immigrants from Yemen and was renamed Bitha, taken from the Book of Isaiah 30:15;
For thus said the Lord GOD, the Holy One of Israel: in sitting still and rest shall ye be saved, in quietness and in confidence shall be your strength; and ye would not.

References

Moshavim
Populated places established in 1950
Populated places in Southern District (Israel)
Yemeni-Jewish culture in Israel
1950 establishments in Israel